Hvizdets is an urban-type settlement in Kolomyia Raion (district) of Ivano-Frankivsk Oblast (region), Ukraine.  It is located  ENE of Kolomyia,  SE of Ivano-Frankivsk and  WSW of Kyiv. Hvizdets hosts the administration of Hvizdets settlement hromada, one of the hromadas of Ukraine. Population: .

The town was the site of the Battle of Gwoździec in 1531, during the Polish-Moldavian wars.

Prior to World War II the town was located in Poland. It is the birthplace of Polish film director Jerzy Kawalerowicz, artist Yaroslav Pstrak and politician Andriy Shevchenko.

Alternate names

Hvizdets was formerly known as Gvozdets (Russian), Gwoździec (Polish), Gvozdetz or Gvodzitz or גוואזדזיעץ (Yiddish), Hvizdec', Gvozhdziyets, and Gvozdzets.

Former Jewish population

The Jewish population of Hvizdets in the year 1900 was 1,663 people, who made up a substantial part of the town's population.  Nearly all were killed in the Holocaust. The famous Gwoździec Synagogue once stood in the village, however, it was burnt down by the German forces during World War II.

References

Urban-type settlements in Kolomyia Raion
Shtetls
Holocaust locations in Ukraine